The 1924–25 Mercer Bears men's basketball team represents Mercer University in the 1924–25 NCAA men's basketball season. The team won the 1925 Southern Intercollegiate Athletic Association men's basketball tournament. Coach Tink Gillam's back-to-back conference titles earned him the nickname "the Napoleon of Southern basketball".

References

Mercer Bears men's basketball seasons
Mercer